The United States Navy Ceremonial Guard is the official ceremonial unit of the United States Navy. It is responsible for the performance of public duties in the U.S. Navy. The guard is composed of 200 enlisted navy personnel.  It is based at Naval District Washington, Washington Navy Yard, Washington D.C. It is currently led by Commander Dave Tickle.

Overview

Established in 1931, the United States Navy Ceremonial Guard represents the Navy in the Presidential, Joint Armed Services, Navy and public ceremonies in the nation's capital and around the world. Each member is trained to be motionless for extended periods of time so that they will be prepared to hold their bearing through the entirety of the longest of military ceremonies. They are trained in the areas of rifle drill manual and marching as well as the daily labor of maintaining the rigorous physical and uniform standards demanded of Ceremonial Guardsmen.

List of specialized platoons 

 HQ
 Commanding Officer: Commander Alex McMahon 
 Commander: Ken Warford
 Command master chief petty officer: Paul McCory
 Bravo Company
 1st Platoon - Casket Bearer
 2nd Platoon - Firing Party
 Charlie Company
 1st Platoon - Color Guard
 2nd Platoon - Ceremonial Drill Team

Requirements 
 Recruits must undergo an intensive 10-week training program before they are considered a guardsman.
 It is a requirement for a sailors in the ceremonial guard to have a minimum height of 183 centimeters (6 ft 0 in). Officers are required to have a minimum height of 178 centimeters (5 ft 10 in).
 Ceremonial Guardsman are required to remain sober while on duty.

Mission

The United States Navy Ceremonial Guard provides along with ceremonial honour guards from the U.S. Army, U.S. Marine Corps, U.S. Coast Guard and the U.S. Air Force during State visits to the United States at the White House and the Pentagon, as well as the inaugural parade every four years, and  Independence Day observances in Washington, D.C. Its personnel serve as Casket bearers, Color guards, and Firing parties at the funerals of Naval Servicemen at Arlington National Cemetery. They also have the Navy ceremonial Guard Drill team that performs all over and outside the U.S.

Navy Ceremonial Duty Ribbon
 

The Navy Ceremonial Duty Ribbon is presented to members of the ceremonial guard who, receives their full honors qualification, and completes a standard tour of duty (2 years) with the United States Navy Ceremonial Guard. It was established on 12 December 2003 by order of Secretary of the Navy Gordon R. England. On 17 January 2012, the name of the Navy Ceremonial Duty Ribbon was changed from the U.S. Navy Ceremonial Guard Ribbon in order to encompass those personnel who have successfully completed a standard tour of duty on board . Multiple awards of the Navy Ceremonial Duty Ribbon are denoted by bronze service stars, while only one award of the ribbon is authorized for each tour of duty.

Uniform 

For the Ceremonial Guard, the enlisted Full Dress uniforms are more elaborate with the wearing of a white pistol belt, ascot, and dress aiguilette (the latter two are white for winter and navy blue for summer), and white canvas leggings. This uniform is due to be replaced in 2021.

Gallery

See also
 United States Navy Band
 Naval District Washington
 3rd U.S. Infantry Regiment (The Old Guard)
 United States Air Force Honor Guard

References

External links

 USN Ceremonial Guard Home Page
 Naval Ceremonial Guard – Behind the Scenes
 Inside Navy's Ceremonial Guard

United States Navy
Ceremonial units of the United States military